Rhodeus sciosemus is a subtropical freshwater fish belonging to the Acheilognathinae subfamily of the  family Cyprinidae.  It originates in inland rivers in Japan. It was originally described as Acanthorhodeus sciosemus by Jordan & Thompson in 1914. When spawning, the females deposit their eggs inside bivalves, where they hatch and the young remain until they can swim.

References 

sciosemus
Fish described in 1914
Taxa named by David Starr Jordan